"Santa Cruz (You're Not That Far)" is the debut single of Irish band the Thrills, taken from the album So Much for the City. It was released on 11 November 2002 but did not chart anywhere at first. After the song was re-released on 25 August 2003 following the success of "Big Sur", it reached number 17 on the Irish Singles Chart and number 33 on the UK Singles Chart.

Track listing

Charts

Release history

References

2002 debut singles
2002 songs
The Thrills songs
Virgin Records singles